Sphyradium doliolum is a species of air-breathing land snail, a terrestrial pulmonate gastropod mollusk in the family Orculidae.

Distribution 
The distribution of this species is central-European and southern-European. This species occurs in the following countries:

 Bulgaria
 Czech Republic - near threatened (NT)
 Netherlands
 Poland
 Slovakia
 Ukraine
 France
 and others

References

 Studer, S. (1789). Faunula Helvetica. Class VI. Vermes. Ordo III. Testacea. - In: W. Coxe, Travels in Switzerland, in a series of letters to William Melmoth, Esq., Volume III: 384-392. London (T. Cadell in the Strand).
 Kerney, M.P., Cameron, R.A.D. & Jungbluth, J-H. (1983). Die Landschnecken Nord- und Mitteleuropas. Ein Bestimmungsbuch für Biologen und Naturfreunde, 384 pp., 24 plates.
 Grossu, A. V. (1986). Nouvelle espèces de la famille des Orculidae (Gastropoda, Pulmonata). Travaux du Muséum d'Histoire Naturelle Grigore Antipa. 28: 5–13. Bucureşti.
 Hausdorf, B. (1996). Die Orculidae Asiens (Gastropoda: Stylommatophora). Archiv für Molluskenkunde, 125 (1/2): 1-86. Frankfurt am Main
 Schileyko, A. A. (1998). Treatise on Recent terrestrial pulmonate molluscs. Part 1. Achatinellidae, Amastridae, Orculidae, Strobilopsidae, Spelaeodiscidae, Valloniidae, Cochlicopidae, Pupillidae, Chondrinidae, Pyramidellidae. Ruthenica. Supplement 2: 1-127. Moskva

External links
 Bruguière J.G. (1789-1792). Encyclopédie méthodique ou par ordre de matières. Histoire naturelle des vers, volume 1. Paris: Pancoucke. Pp. i-xviii, 1-344 
 Mousson, A. (1873). Coquilles recueillies par M. le Dr Sievers dans la Russie Méridionale et Asiatique. Journal de Conchyliologie, 21 (3): 193-230, pl. 7-8. Paris 
 Westerlund, C. A. (1896). Neue centralasiatische Mollusken. Ezhegodnik Zoologicheskogo Muzeya Imperatorskoy Akademii Nauk (Annuaire du Musée Zoologique de l'Académie Impériale des Sciences de Saint-Pétersbourg). 1: 181-198
 chileyko, A. A. & Rymzhanov, T. S. (2013). Fauna of land mollusks (Gastropoda, Pulmonata Terrestria) of Kazakhstan and adjacent territories. Moscow-Almaty: KMK Scientific Press. 389 pp.

Orculidae
Gastropods described in 1792